Anderson Regional Medical Center is a hospital located in Meridian, Mississippi.

Overview
Anderson Regional Medical Center (also known as Anderson Regional Medical Center-North) functions as a short-term acute care hospital with 260 beds and is the flagship hospital of Anderson Regional Health System. The hospital is fully accredited by The Joint Commission. Anderson Regional operates as a Level III trauma center and Level III pediatric trauma center. The hospital maintains a health and fitness center, sleep disorders center, outpatient pharmacy and gift shop, diagnostic imaging suite, express care clinic, and pain management clinic, in addition to multiple outpatient specialty clinics. Anderson Regional has been certified as a Baby Friendly facility.

The health system operates three outpatient clinics outside of Meridian: Anderson Family Medical Clinic-Airpark in Philadelphia, Anderson Family Medical Clinic-Enterprise in Enterprise, and Hickory Family Medical Clinic in Hickory.

As of 2019, the Anderson Regional Health system employed 1,343 people, making it the third-largest employer in Lauderdale County.

The East Central Mississippi Health Network Family Medicine Residency Program utilizes Anderson Regional for residency rotations.

History
In 1929, Dr. Jeff Anderson purchased the 30-bed Turner Hospital in Meridian and renamed it Anderson Infirmary. During the Great Depression, Dr. Anderson mortgaged his private home to keep the hospital open. When the hospital expanded to 120 beds it was renamed Jeff Anderson Memorial Hospital, then renamed Jeff Anderson Regional Medical Center in 1975.

Anderson Regional began an affiliation with the University of Mississippi Medical Center in 2017. As part of the affiliation Anderson gained access to subspecialties (including pediatric subspecialties), that are not available in Meridian.

In 2019, the Anderson Regional Cancer Center became the first center in the United States to treat cancer using RaySearch Laboratories treatment planning system and Accuray Incorporated's Tomotherapy treatment delivery system concurrently.

Anderson Regional Medical Center-South
In 2010, Anderson Regional Health System purchased Riley Memorial Hospital in Meridian and renamed the facility Anderson Regional Medical Center-South. Riley Hospital was a 140-bed facility and the acquisition allowed Anderson to expand inpatient rehabilitation and long-term acute care.

Riley Hospital was founded in 1930 by Dr. Franklin Riley. Dr. Riley was a World War I veteran and native of Tupelo who completed his residency at the University of Pennsylvania. He became Meridian's first residency-trained pediatrician in 1922 and was one of the founding members of the American Board of Pediatrics and the American Academy of Pediatrics. In 1930 Dr. Riley opened a 12-bed women's and children's hospital in Meridian, which was the first of its kind in Mississippi. The hospital continued to expand over the years and was converted to a nonprofit facility. Dr. Riley's sons, William and Richard Riley, both completed medical school at Vanderbilt University School of Medicine and returned to Meridian to work with their father. In 1998, the hospital was sold to Health Management Associates.

References

External links
Anderson Regional Medical Center

Buildings and structures in Lauderdale County, Mississippi
Hospitals in Mississippi
Hospitals established in 1929
Trauma centers